Făurei is a town located in Brăila County, Romania.

Since 1978, it has been the site of a railway testing center.

People
 George Dragomir (b. 2003), football player
 Bănel Nicoliță (b. 1985), football player

References

Populated places in Brăila County
Localities in Muntenia
Towns in Romania